Aquimarina intermedia  is a Gram-negative, heterotrophic, aerobic bacterium from the genus of Aquimarina which has been isolated from the sea urchin Strongylocentrotus intermedius from the Peter the Great Gulf in Russia.

References

External links
Type strain of Aquimarina intermedia at BacDive -  the Bacterial Diversity Metadatabase	

Flavobacteria
Bacteria described in 2006